In physics, a drift velocity is the average velocity attained by charged particles, such as electrons, in a material due to an electric field. In general, an electron in a conductor will propagate randomly at the Fermi velocity, resulting in an average velocity of zero. Applying an electric field adds to this random motion a small net flow in one direction; this is the drift.
 

Drift velocity is proportional to current. In a resistive material, it is also proportional to the magnitude of an external electric field. Thus Ohm's law can be explained in terms of drift velocity. The law's most elementary expression is:

In the MKS system, these quantities' units are m/s, m2/(V·s), and V/m, respectively.

When a potential difference is applied across a conductor, free electrons gain velocity in the direction, opposite to the electric field between successive collisions (and lose velocity when traveling in the direction of the field), thus acquiring a velocity component in that direction in addition to its random thermal velocity. As a result, there is a definite small drift velocity of electrons, which is superimposed on the random motion of free electrons. Due to this drift velocity, there is a net flow of electrons opposite to the direction of the field.

Experimental measure
The formula for evaluating the drift velocity of charge carriers in a material of constant cross-sectional area is given by:

This can also be written as:

But the current density and drift velocity, j and u, are in fact vectors, so this relationship is often written as:

where

is the charge density (SI unit: coulombs per cubic metre).

In terms of the basic properties of the right-cylindrical current-carrying metallic ohmic conductor, where the charge-carriers are electrons, this expression can be rewritten as:

where
 is again the drift velocity of the electrons, in m⋅s−1
 is the molecular mass of the metal, in kg
 is the electric conductivity of the medium at the temperature considered, in S/m.
 is the voltage applied across the conductor, in V
 is the density (mass per unit volume) of the conductor, in kg⋅m−3
 is the elementary charge, in C
 is the number of free electrons per atom
 is the length of the conductor, in m

Numerical example 
Electricity is most commonly conducted through copper wires. In one mole of any element, there are  atoms (the Avogadro number). Copper has one free electron per atom, so  is equal to  electrons per cubic metre.

Assume a current , and a wire of  diameter (radius = ). This wire has a cross sectional area  of π ×2 =  = . The drift velocity therefore can be calculated:

Dimensional analysis:

At 60Hz alternating current, this means that, within half a cycle, on average the electrons drift less than 0.2 μm. In context, at one ampere around  electrons will flow across the contact point twice per cycle. But out of around  movable electrons per meter of wire, this is an insignificant fraction.

See also
Flow velocity
Electron mobility
Speed of electricity
Drift chamber
Guiding center

References

External links
 Ohm's Law: Microscopic View at Hyperphysics

Electric current
Charge carriers